Heikki Heikinpoika Vaanila (1630–1709) was a Finnish farmer and parliamentarian from Vaanila village in Lohja, Uusimaa. He was chairman of the Estate of Swedish Peasants at the Swedish Riksdag of the Estates in 1680, that established absolute monarchy in Sweden and reduced the privileges of the Swedish nobility. He was also the chairman of the Finnish peasants at the States of Finland held in Turku in 1676.
He was a member of the regency council during the minority of Charles XI of Sweden.

References 
 KANSANVALLAN PÄIVÄN PÄIVÄN VIETTOA KOSKEVA ALOITE (Same in Swedish)
 Kansallisbiografia.fi: Vanberg, Henrik Henrikinpoika
 Luettelo Suomen talonpoikaissäädyn valtiopäiväedustajista säätyvaltiopäivillä 
 Eino Jutikkala, Hindrick Hindersson, den nyländske talmannen för bondeståndet vid 1680 års riksdag in the Historisk tidskrift för Finland 1951 
 Valtiopäivämies Gabriel Antinpoika Heikkilän (1726-1807) genealoginen tausta 

1630 births
1709 deaths
People from Lohja
Finnish politicians
Members of the Riksdag of the Estates
17th-century Swedish politicians
17th-century Finnish people